{{DISPLAYTITLE:C24H30N2O2}}
The molecular formula C24H30N2O2 (molar mass: 378.51 g/mol) may refer to:

 Desmethylmoramide
 Doxapram
 Tetrahydrofuranylfentanyl

Molecular formulas